State Route 117 (SR 117) is a state highway in the U.S. state of Virginia.  Known as Peters Creek Road, the state highway runs  from U.S. Route 11 (US 11) in Roanoke north to US 11 in Hollins.  SR 117 provides a four-lane divided highway bypass of Downtown Roanoke, connecting US 11 and US 460 on the southwest and northwest sides of Roanoke and Hollins in northeastern Roanoke County.

Route description

SR 117 begins at an intersection with US 11 (Brandon Avenue) west of Downtown Roanoke.  The state highway heads north as a five-lane road with a center left-turn lane that crosses Norfolk Southern Railway's Whitethorne District.  North of the rail crossing, SR 117 becomes a divided highway with controlled access.  The state highway passes through an industrial park and crosses over the Roanoke River and the western end of the rail yard on Norfolk Southern's Christiansburg District.  North of the rail yard, SR 117 intersects Shenandoah Avenue to the east of the Salem Veterans Affairs Medical Center.  The state highway begins to parallel Peters Creek to the west of the Wilmont neighborhood and intersects Salem Turnpike before reaching its junction with US 460 and US 11 Alternate (Melrose Avenue).

SR 117 continues north along Peters Creek as the highway passes to the west of the Washington Heights and Westview Terrace neighborhoods and meets the western end of SR 101 (Hershberger Road).  At its intersection with Cove Road, the boundary between the city of Roanoke and Roanoke County begins to follow the western margin of the road, which curves to the northeast away from Peters Creek and has a cloverleaf interchange with Interstate 581 and US 220.  SR 117 passes along the northern edge of Roanoke Regional Airport and enters Roanoke County at its intersection with SR 628 (Wood Haven Road).  A short distance east of the city limit, the state highway meets the northern end of SR 118 (Airport Road), which provides access to the airport from the north.  SR 117 reaches its northern terminus at US 11 (Williamson Road) in Hollins.

History
Prior to 1998, the road cut off at Melrose Avenue. Prior to 1947, the road continued eastbound on Melrose Avenue/East Main Street into Salem, ending at about Roanoke College; however, it is unclear if the road ended at College Avenue (U.S. Route 11) or Craig Street (then Virginia State Route 311). It had a "Y" alignment at this time, Texas Street and Lynchburg Turnpike, that are now part of U.S. 460 Alternate.

Major intersections

References

External links

Virginia Highways Project: VA 117

117
State Route 117
State Route 117